Carpus of Beroea  of the Seventy Disciples is commemorated by the Church on May 26 with Alphaeus, and on January 4 with the Seventy.

In his second Epistle to Timothy (2 Timothy 4:13), Paul requests, "The phelonion that I left at Troas with Carpus, when thou comest, bring with thee, and the books." Carpus was bishop of Beroea (or Verria) in Macedonia.

Hymns
Troparion (Tone 3) 
O holy Apostle Carpus,
Entreat the merciful God,
To grant our souls forgiveness of transgressions.

Kontakion (Tone 4) 
The Church possesses You as a shining star,
O Holy Apostle Carpus,
And is illumined by the multitude of your miracles.
Save those who honor in faith
Your holy memory.

External links
The Synaxis of the Holy Seventy Apostles - Chrysostom Press.
Apostle Carpus of the Seventy, January 4 (OCA)
Apostle Carpus of the Seventy, May 26 (OCA)

References

Seventy disciples
1st-century bishops in the Roman Empire
Saints of Roman Macedonia
Ancient Beroeans